is a puzzle game released by Tecmo for the Nintendo Entertainment System. It is the prequel to Solomon's Key, and is known as Fire 'n Ice in North America. The game was released in Japan in January 1992, and America and Europe in March 1993. The game was subsequently rereleased as part of Nintendo Switch Online in February 2021.

Gameplay

The game's plot takes place before the original Solomon's Key, and is framed as a story being told by an elderly woman to her grandchildren. The story takes place on Coolmint Island, an island made of ice and home to the winter fairies. When the evil wizard Druidle begins sending flame monsters to attack and melt the island, the queen of the fairies summons the apprentice wizard Dana to defend them, granting him the use of ice magic to help extinguish the flame monsters.

In each stage, players control Dana and attempt put out all the fires. The fires are extinguished by either kicking an ice block into the flame, or dropping one from above. Dana's moveset includes the abilities to walk left and right across level ground. He can also climb on top of a solid block to his left or right, provided it is only one block tall and there is nothing on top of it. Dana can also push blocks of ice, which will then slide until they fall or hit a wall. Dana's most important ability is his ice magic. He can create and destroy blocks of ice. As the gameplay is grid-based, Dana's ice magic affects the squares beneath him and to the left and right, similar to Lode Runner. If the ice block is placed horizontally adjacent to a wall, pipe, jar, or another ice block, it will freeze to the adjacent surface.

There are also other elements that are introduced as the player progresses, including pipes (which Dana can travel through) and jars. Dana can walk across normal jars, but once a jar comes in contact with a flame, it begins to burn. Dana cannot walk across the top of burning jars, and any ice that is created in, or enters the square above a burning jar is destroyed. As players progress, the puzzles get more complicated and difficult. The simple gameplay must be used in new ways by players who wish to complete the game.

The game's main story features 10 worlds, each with 10 stages to complete. The Japanese release includes an internal save battery, allowing players to save their progress, while the English releases instead features a password system. Upon completing all 100 stages and defeating Druidle, a cheat code is presented that unlocks a sound test option and 50 additional bonus stages. The game also features a stage editor, allowing players to design their own stages and puzzles. However, only the Japanese version allows players to save their created stages.

References

External links

1992 video games
Nintendo Entertainment System games
Nintendo Switch Online games
Puzzle video games
Single-player video games
Tecmo games
Video game prequels
Video games about witchcraft
Video games developed in Japan